Neciosup is a surname from the Mochica language. Notable people with the surname include:

Alejandro Neciosup Acuña - Peruvian drummer and percussionist
Hector "Pocho" Neciosup - Peruvian drummer and Alehandro's nephew
Jair Neciosup - featured on backing vocals on Truant
Don Alex Neciosup Alcántara - president of Carlos A. Mannucci in the 70s

Surnames of Peruvian origin